A list of films produced by the Marathi language film industry based in Maharashtra in the year 1941.

1941 Releases
A list of Marathi films released in 1941.

References

External links
Gomolo - 

Lists of 1941 films by country or language
1941
1941 in Indian cinema